Don Samuel Goonesekera (13 November 1896 – 7 August 1983) was a former politician and member of parliament.

Don Samuel Goonesekera was born 13 November 1896 in Habaraduwa, the only son of Don Marthelis Goonesekera and Dona Clare Abeygoonewardena. He received his primary education from the Dharmika School, Katukurunda, Habaraduwa and his secondary education at Mahinda College, Galle. He then worked as a land surveyor before entering into politics. In 1927 he became the chairman of the Kodagoda Village Council. In 1939 he was elected as a Councilor (representing the Main Street Ward) on the Galle Municipal Council and in 1944 was subsequently elected as Mayor of Galle. At the first parliament election in 1947 he contested the seat for the Udugama Electoral District, on behalf of the United National Party, becoming its first MP. In the subsequent parliamentary election in 1952 he lost the seat, after switching to the Sri Lanka Freedom Party. He was successful in regaining the seat at the 1956 parliamentary election. In 1959 he was appointed as Parliamentary Secretary to the Minister of Trade and Commerce by Prime Minister S. W. R. D. Bandaranaike.

References

Members of the 1st Parliament of Ceylon
Members of the 3rd Parliament of Ceylon
Members of the 5th Parliament of Ceylon
People from British Ceylon
Sinhalese politicians
Sri Lanka Freedom Party politicians
1896 births
1983 deaths
Labour ministers of Sri Lanka
Social affairs ministers of Sri Lanka